Mount Spokane Ski and Snowboard Park is a ski resort in the western United States, located inside Mount Spokane State Park in Spokane County, Washington, about  northeast of Spokane via State Route 206. Its slopes are primarily east-facing, and are served by six chairlifts.

History
Additional land at Mount Spokane was obtained due to the efforts of Cheney Cowles (1908–1943), whose father ran the Cowles Publishing Company. Cowles was the managing editor of the Spokane Daily Chronicle and was an original member of the Spokane Ski Club; he was killed in military plane crash in Alabama during 

The Vista House at the summit was constructed in 1933, and built by local Washington contractor E.O. Fieldstad – the first of five fire lookouts on the mountain, some of which were constructed by the Civilian Conservation Corps (CCC). Mount Spokane hosted the Northwest ski championships in February 1937. Future Olympic gold medalist Gretchen Fraser (née Kunigk), then 18, won the women's slalom.

A new day lodge (#1) was built by the state on the east side and a Riblet double chair was installed in the summer of 1956. A second was added five years later, and a third in 1970. The fourth chair was added a few years later, the fifth in 1977 and the sixth in 2018. Night skiing on Mount Spokane began  in December 1967.

The majority owner of the Mount Spokane Chairlift, Inc. was founder Al E. Mettler  who sold his interest in 1970 to  Six years later, Caley filed for Chapter 11 bankruptcy and the ski area assets were sold to a creditor, Riblet Tramway Company of Spokane. Mettler returned in March 1976, as interim general manager for a few months, relieved by Keith Petrie, previously at Anthony Lakes in eastern Oregon. Sam Wormington took over in 1977, moving southwest to Spokane from nearby  in

References

External links
 
 Mount Spokane.org – history
 Ski Map.org – trail maps – Mount Spokane ski area

Ski areas and resorts in Washington (state)
Buildings and structures in Spokane County, Washington
Tourist attractions in Spokane County, Washington